Major-General Sir Francis Wheler, 10th Baronet CB (1801–1878) was a British Indian Army officer, serving in the Bengal cavalry. 

He inherited the baronetcy on the death of his older brother Sir Trevor on 6 September 1869.

Wheler married twice: 

1) 1827 Caroline Palmer, with whom he had two children:
 Harriet Anne Wheler
 Sir Trevor Wheler, 11th Baronet (1828–1900)
2) 1841 Elizabeth Bishop (ca. 1819–1900), daughter of William Bishop, of Grayswood, Surrey, with whom he had three children:
 Dorothy Wheler 
 Lieutenant-Colonel Francis Henry Wheler (b.1848), Loyal North Lancashire Regiment; m. 1885 Jenny Highett, and had issue
 Colonel Charles Stuart Wheler (b.1851), 6th Bengal Cavalry; m. 1876 Alice Lilian Ogilvie, and had issue

Sir Francis died on 4 April 1878, aged 76. His grave is in the church of All Saints in Leamington Hastings near Rugby. Lady Wheler died at South Lawn, Hesketh-park, Southport, on 16 March 1900, aged 80.

References

1801 births
1878 deaths
Companions of the Order of the Bath
Baronets in the Baronetage of England
British Indian Army generals